Francisco de Paula may refer to:
 Infante Francisco de Paula of Spain (1794–1865), infant of Spain
 Francisco de Paula Aguirre (1875–1939), Venezuelan composer
 Francisco De Paula Bazán (born 1980), Peruvian goalkeeper
 Don Francisco de Paula Marín (1774–1837), Spanish advisor to Kingdom of Hawaii
 Francisco de Paula Martínez de la Rosa, Prime Minister of Spain
 Francisco de Paula Rodrigues Alves (1848–1919), president of Brazil
 Francisco de Paula Santander (1792–1840), military and politician leader of Colombia
 José Francisco de Paula Señan (1760–1823), Spanish missionary to the Americas
 Francisco de Paula del Villar y Lozano (1828–1901), Spanish architect
 Francisco de Paula Vieira da Silva de Tovar, 1st Viscount of Molelos (1774–1848), Portuguese military officer and politician
 Saint Francis of Paola, also known as Francisco de Paula
 Francisco de Paula (actor) (1913–1985), was an Argentine actor

Places
 Francisco de Paula Santander University, University of Brazil
 São Francisco de Paula, Rio Grande do Sul, city of Brazil
 São Francisco de Paula, Minas Gerais, municipality of Brazil

De Paula, Francisco